The 2017 Ladies European Tour was a series of golf tournaments for elite female golfers from around the world, which takes place from February through December 2017. The tournaments are sanctioned by the Ladies European Tour (LET).

Schedule
The table below shows the 2017 schedule. The numbers in brackets after the winners' names indicate the career wins on the Ladies European Tour, including that event, and is only shown for members of the tour.

Key

Order of Merit rankings

See also
2017 LPGA Tour

References

External links
Official site of the Ladies European Tour
Ladies European Tour Information Centre

Ladies European Tour
Ladies European Tour
Ladies European Tour